Shamsabad-e Olya (also Romanized as Shamsābād-e ‘Olyā; also known as Shamsābād and Shamsīābād) is a village in Howmeh Rural District, in the Central District of Bam County, Kerman Province, Iran. At the 2006 census, its population was 40, in 12 families.

References 

Populated places in Bam County